Shallcross is a Queen Anne style house built in 1898 in Anchorage, Kentucky by William B. Wood.

It was listed on the National Register of Historic Places in 1980 for its architectural significance.

References

Houses on the National Register of Historic Places in Kentucky
Queen Anne architecture in Kentucky
Houses completed in 1898
Houses in Jefferson County, Kentucky
National Register of Historic Places in Jefferson County, Kentucky
1898 establishments in Kentucky
Anchorage, Kentucky